J M Ntsime High School is situated in Zone 4 Mogwase (Moses Kotane Local Municipality) on the outskirts of Rustenburg, South Africa. The school was established in 1989 from Nkakane High School which used to share premises with Mogwase Middle School. It is named after a famous Setswana novelist, dramatist and former minister of education of the Bophuthatswana homeland government, J M Ntsime to acknowledge his contribution to preserve the language and culture. The school has a student body of over 800 and staff complement of more than 40 teachers and other services. The first principal of the school was Mr Huma.  J M Ntsime prides itself as a high performing school in the region and in the country, hence it was recognised as a Dinaledi school in 2001. It has a high reputation in music and Setswana dance, with the cultural team winning the school several awards and performing in Egypt in 2003. 

Educational institutions established in 1989
1989 establishments in South Africa
High schools in South Africa
Schools in North West (South African province)
Moses Kotane Local Municipality